The International Day of Older People  is observed on October 1 each year.

On December 14, 1990 the United Nations General Assembly voted to establish October 1 as the International Day of Older People as recorded in Resolution 45/106.  The holiday was observed for the first time on October 1, 1991.

The observance is a focus of ageing organizations and the United Nations Programme on Ageing.

Annual Themes
 1998 & 2000: Towards A Society for All Ages.
 2004: Older Persons in an Intergenerational Society.
 2005: Ageing in the New Millennium.
 2006: Improving the Quality of Life for Older Persons: Advancing UN Global Strategies.
 2007: Addressing the Challenges and Opportunities of Ageing.
 2008: Rights of Older Persons.
 2009: Celebrating the 10th Anniversary of the International Year of Older Persons: Towards a Society for All Ages.
 2010: Older Persons and the Achievement of the MDGs.
 2011: The Growing Opportunities & Challenges of Global Ageing.
 2012: Longevity: Shaping the Future.
 2013: The Future We Want: What Older Persons are Saying.
 2014: Leaving No One Behind: Promoting a Society for All.
 2015: Sustainability and Age Inclusiveness in the Urban Environment.
 2016: Take a Stand Against Ageism.
 2017: Stepping into the Future: Tapping the Talents, Contributions and Participation of Older Persons in Society.
 2018: Celebrating Older Human Rights Champions.
 2019: The Journey to Age Equality.
 2020: Pandemics: Do They Change How We Address Age and Ageing?
2021: Digital Equity for All Ages.
2022: Resilience of Older Persons in a Changing World.

Perception
There is an initiative to celebrate October 1 as the International Longevity Day in order to draw attention to aging as a medical challenge that requires, first of all, biomedical solution.

See also

 Aging-associated diseases
 Ageism
 Elderly care
 Geriatrics
 International observances
 World Senior Citizen's Day

References

External links
 Official UN Site
 Official WHO Site
 International Federation on Ageing
 Oct 01, 2019: 'International Day of Older Persons' Celebrated at Light & Life Academy, India

October observances
Older Persons, International Day of
Old age